Vellucci is a surname. Notable people with the surname include:

Alfred Vellucci (1915–2002), American politician
Mike Vellucci (born 1966), American ice hockey player and coach
Peter A. Vellucci (1942/43–2014), American politician